Tomislav Mišura (born 13 May 1981 in Novo Mesto) is a Slovenian footballer who plays for Icelandic club Grindavík.

Biography
His previous club was Interblock. In November 2010 Tomislav trialled with the A-League club Newcastle Jets. The Jets then signed Mišura on an injury replacement contract.

References

External links
Player profile at PrvaLiga 
Tomislav Mišura at ZeroZero

1981 births
Living people
Sportspeople from Novo Mesto
Slovenian footballers
Association football forwards
NK Olimpija Ljubljana (1945–2005) players
NK Krka players
FC Admira Wacker Mödling players
NK Kamen Ingrad players
FC Lokomotiv 1929 Sofia players
FC Wil players
FC Gossau players
Austrian Football Bundesliga players
First Professional Football League (Bulgaria) players
NK IB 1975 Ljubljana players
Qingdao Hainiu F.C. (1990) players
Beijing Sport University F.C. players
China League One players
Chinese Super League players
Expatriate footballers in Bulgaria
Expatriate footballers in China
Slovenian expatriate sportspeople in China
Expatriate footballers in Vietnam
Newcastle Jets FC players
A-League Men players
Neftçi PFK players